Silas John Titus (September 23, 1918 – February 17, 1989) was an American football player. 

A native of New York City, he attended Brooklyn Prep and played college football for Holy Cross. He then played professional football in the National Football League (NFL) for the Brooklyn Dodgers from 1940 to 1942 and for the Pittsburgh Steelers in 1945. He appeared in 28 games as a center. He served in the United States Marine Corps during World War II, participated in two amphibious invasions, was one of the first Marines to land during the Battle of Saipan, and was wounded at the Battle of Iwo Jima. He died in 1989 at age 70. His brother George Titus also played for the Pittsburgh Steelers.

References

1918 births
1989 deaths
Brooklyn Dodgers (NFL) players
Pittsburgh Steelers players
Holy Cross Crusaders football players
Players of American football from New York (state)
United States Marine Corps personnel of World War II